Strabops is a monotypic genus of fungus weevils in the family Anthribidae. It contains one species, Strabops insignis.

References

Anthribidae